The 2019 South and Central American Beach Handball Championship was the first edition of the tournament, took place in Maricá, Brazil from 11 to 14 july 2019. It acted as the South and Central American qualifying tournament for the 2020 Beach Handball World Championships and the 2019 World Beach Games.

Participating teams

Men

 (withdrew)

Women

 (withdrew)

Men's tournament

Qualification round

Knockout stage

Bracket

Final ranking

Women's tournament

Qualification round

Knockout stage

Bracket

Final ranking

References

External links
CAH official website

South and Central American Beach Handball Championship
South and Central American Beach Handball Championship
South
South and Central American Beach Handball Championship
South and Central American Beach Handball Championship